Dahlica lazuri is a moth of the family Psychidae. It was described by Carl Alexander Clerck in 1759. It is found in France, the Benelux, Germany, Switzerland, Austria, the Baltic region, Scandinavia and Russia.

The wingspan is 6–15 mm. Adults have been recorded on wing from April to June.

Taxonomy
Formerly fumosella was treated as the bisexual race of lichenella, but its taxonomical status is controversial. Robinson and Nielsen proposed the name lazuri for fumosella in 1983, because there is no doubt, that this is an older subjective synonym.

References

 "Dahlica lazuri (Clerck, 1759)". Insecta.pro. Retrieved January 24, 2019.

Moths described in 1759
Psychidae
Moths of Europe
Taxa named by Carl Alexander Clerck